Essie Kelley-Washington (born January 12, 1957) is an American former middle-distance runner who specialized in the 800-meter run. She was the gold medallist in that event at the 1979 Pan American Games. She also represented America at the 1983 World Championships in Athletics and 1987 Pan American Games, reaching both finals.

At national level at the USA Outdoor Track and Field Championships she was a regular finalist during her career and won the 800 m twice: in 1979 then again in 1987. She was runner-up in 1978 and made her last final in 1990, taking seventh place.

After retiring from running Kelley went into coaching. She had gained a degree in physical education from Prairie View A&M University in 1980. She served as head coach for the 1999 Pan American Games delegation and was assistant coach on the 1997 Summer Universiade team.

International competitions

National titles
USA Outdoor Track and Field Championships
800 m: 1979, 1987

References

External links



Living people
1957 births
American female middle-distance runners
Pan American Games gold medalists for the United States
Pan American Games medalists in athletics (track and field)
Athletes (track and field) at the 1979 Pan American Games
Athletes (track and field) at the 1987 Pan American Games
World Athletics Championships athletes for the United States
American track and field coaches
Female sports coaches
Prairie View A&M University alumni
Medalists at the 1979 Pan American Games
20th-century American women